Aquimarina megaterium  is a Gram-negative, strictly aerobic and rod-shaped bacterium from the genus of Aquimarina which has been isolated from seawater from the South Pacific Gyre.

References 

Flavobacteria
Bacteria described in 2014